Merrill G. Burlingame (March 13, 1901 – November 14, 1994) was a history professor at Montana State University in Bozeman, Montana who specialized in Montana history and the history of the American West.  He was instrumental in the founding of the Museum of the Rockies and driving force behind the resurgence of the Montana Historical Society in the 1960s.  In his time, he was known as "Mr. Montana History."

Early life
Merrill Gildea Burlingame was born in Boone, Iowa on March 13, 1901.  He was the son of Nathan and Teresa Gildea Burlingame. He attended local schools prior to attending college at the University of Minnesota, the University of Wisconsin, and the University of Iowa where he ultimately received his doctorate in history in 1936.  Before joining the faculty of Montana State College in 1929 he taught history at various high schools in Minnesota and Nebraska.  He married another historian, Virginia Struble of Davenport, Iowa, in 1936.  She was the author of numerous children's short stories and books with environmental and historical themes.

Montana State University
Burlingame joined the faculty of Montana State College (now Montana State University) as a history professor in 1929.  In 1935 he was appointed chairman of the history department.  He was granted emeritus status in 1969. Burlingame was an active researcher who wrote numerous works on Montana history, among them two books relating to Montana State University's general history. The first, Montana State College 1893 to 1919: a preliminary sketch was published in 1943 in conjunction with the university's 50th anniversary. The second, A History, Montana State University, Bozeman, Montana, was published in 1968 to commemorate the university's 75th anniversary. Burlingame wrote other works relating to the university including The Danforth Chapel and Religious Activities at Montana State University, 1893–1991 (1991) and The Montana Cooperative Extension Service: A history, 1893–1974 (1984).

Burlingame was instrumental in the establishment of the Museum of the Rockies with physician Caroline M. McGill, a Butte, Montana physician, who was a noted collector of Montana antiquities. Burlingame was appointed the first museum director in December 1959. He helped preserve the Montana-related records of the Works Progress Administration Federal Writers' Project.

Montana Historical Society
Burlingame was closely associated with the Montana Historical Society and considered a founder of Montana: The Magazine of Western History, the society's quarterly journal. He sat on the society's Board of Trustees from 1949–1976, serving as president of the board from 1967–1969, and on the magazine's editorial board from its inception in 1950 until 1985.

Legacy
The Montana Historical Society annually recognizes the historical research and writings of undergraduate and graduate students in history with its Merrill G. Burlingame and K. Ross Toole award. The Special Collections and Archives of the Montana State University Library are named after Burlingame.  His work The Montana Frontier first published in 1942 is considered a seminal work of Montana history.

Bibliography
 
 
  – Reprinted in 1980

Notes

Historians of Montana
People from Boone, Iowa
Writers from Bozeman, Montana
University of Minnesota alumni
University of Wisconsin–Madison alumni
University of Iowa alumni
Montana State University faculty
1901 births
1994 deaths
20th-century American historians
20th-century American male writers
American male non-fiction writers
Historians from Iowa